Hank Harris (born November 5, 1979) is an American actor who has been working in movies and television since the late 1990s. He grew up in Duluth, Minnesota and Santa Fe, New Mexico.

He is perhaps best known for his role as Emory Dick in Popular. His other projects have included: Mercury Rising, Pumpkin, Hellbent and the television series Dirty Work. A commercial actor, Harris is best known in the 90's for appearing in 11 Chef Boyardee commercials as the "beefy boy", as well as ones for McDonald's, Wendy's, Burger King, Dr. Pepper, and T-Mobile.

Filmography

References

External links
 

Living people
American male television actors
American male film actors
20th-century American male actors
21st-century American male actors
Male actors from Duluth, Minnesota
People from Santa Fe, New Mexico
Male actors from New Mexico
1979 births